Dipropyltin dichloride is an organotin compound with the chemical formula . It is a white solid. This chemical belongs to a subclass of organotin compounds called diorganotin dihalides (where R is organyl and X is a halogen).

Uses
Dipropyltin dichloride has broad applications in industry and laboratory. It can be used as a polyvinyl chloride stabilizer, fungicide and insecticide.

Hazards and toxicity
Dipropyltin dichloride can be absorbed through skin, causing intoxication. It irritates skin, eyes and respiratory system. It is toxic if swallowed. It is suspected this chemical is a human mutagen and teratogen, and toxic to the reproductive system.

Dipropyltin dichloride may react violently with strong oxidizing agents. Upon catching fire, irritating and toxic fumes, gases and smokes are released, like carbon monoxide (CO), carbon dioxide, tin(II) oxide (SnO), tin(IV) oxide and hydrogen chloride (HCl).

References 

Organotin compounds